Jan Långbacka (born April 12, 1968, in Espoo, Finland) is a retired professional ice hockey player who played in the SM-Liiga. He played for Espoo Blues and Jokerit. He has been captain of the Espoo Blues, who were named Kiekko-Espoo at that time, during two seasons between 1992 and 1994. He was a center.

External links

1968 births
Living people
Sportspeople from Espoo
Finnish ice hockey centres
Espoo Blues players
Jokerit players
20th-century Finnish people